The Council of American Maritime Museums (CAMM) was established in 1974 to be a network for professionals working in North American maritime museums.  It has a membership of some eighty museums in the United States, Canada, Mexico, and Bermuda.

External links
 Official CAMM website

Museum organizations
Maritime museums
History organizations based in the United States
Organizations established in 1974
Maritime history organizations